Culpeper County Public Schools is a school district in Culpeper County, Virginia, USA. The district is designated to carry out the functions designated by Article VIII of the Constitution of Virginia and consists of 10 schools (six elementary schools, two middle schools and two high schools) serving over 8,000 students.

Administration
The District is led by an elected school board which appoints a superintendent.  Culpeper’s schools are governed by an elected board of seven members representing its magisterial districts. Members serve four year terms. The board holds a regular monthly meeting, typically on the second Monday. Additional meetings for discipline cases and work sessions are scheduled as needed.

The superintendent of Culpeper County Public Schools is Anthony S. Brads.

Board members
, the Board members are:
Patricia Baker, Chair
Barbara Brown, Vice Chair
Christina Burnett
Deborah Desilets
Elizabeth Hutchins
Anne Luckinbill
Betsy Smith
Piper Lenon
Ariana Rosales

Schools

High Schools (Grades 9-12)
 Culpeper County High School
 Eastern View High School

Middle Schools (Grades 6-8)
 Culpeper Middle School
 Floyd T. Binns Middle School

Elementary Schools (Grades PreK-5)
 A.G. Richardson Elementary School
 Emerald Hill Elementary School
 Farmington Elementary School
 Pearl Sample Elementary School
 Sycamore Park Elementary School
 Yowell Elementary School

References

External links
 

School divisions in Virginia
Education in Culpeper County, Virginia